The Łęg  is a river in south-eastern Poland, a right tributary of the Vistula River, with a length of  and a basin area of . Its source is in the village of Styków in Subcarpathian Voivodeship.

Tributaries

Tributaries of the Łęg include:
 Czarna
 Turka
 Przyrwa
 Murynia

See also
 Rivers of Poland

References

Rivers of Poland
Rivers of Podkarpackie Voivodeship